Star Raiders: The Adventures of Saber Raine is a US-American 2017 science fiction film about a group of mercenaries who embark on a mission to rescue a prince and princess from an evil tyrant on a far away planet. It was directed by Mark Steven Grove, and stars Casper Van Dien, Cynthia Rothrock, James Lew, Brit Laree, Sara N. Salazar and Sarah Sansoni.

Plot
A prince and princess are abducted from their planet. Saber Raine, a soldier of fortune is hired to bring them back. Along with three others, he embarks on the mission. They end up on a planet in the depths of space which is run by an evil overlord called Sinjin. Having been freed from centuries of containment in a cryogenic prison, Sinjin is now teaming up with beings called the Quintari who have caused havoc throughout the galaxy. Sinjin has a plan of revenge against his betrayers' descendants and he has a powerful weapon.

Cast
 Casper Van Dien as Saber Raine
 Cynthia Rothrock as Kandra Syn
 James Lew as Sinjin
 Brit Laree as Fade
 Sara N. Salazar as Caliope
 Mark Steven Grove as Kor'Rok
 Kevin Sean Ryan as Xorian
 Sarah Sansoni as Andromeda
 Cordy McGowan as Cersi
 Adam Lipsius as Admiral Steele
 Tyler Weaver Jr. as Tyr
 Andy Hankins as Commander Voss
 Holly Westwood as Crotalus
 Nico Feula as Dane
 Michael Grell as Jax Grymm
 Scott Sheely as Mutate

Production
The film was produced by Uptown 6 Productions, Fusion Factory Films, and Don’t Pose Productions. The film was co-produced by Adam Lipsius and Mark Steven Grove as well as directed by Grove.

Release
Star Raiders was subject to a live RiffTrax show in 2019.

References

External links
 Official website
 
 "Star Raiders: The Adventures of Saber Raine" Review by Phil Wheat
 BPA: Bullet Points: Star Raiders: The Adventures of Saber Raine
 Sci-Fi History: Stardate 04.10.2017.A: Never Fear, Saber Raine Is Here!
 

2017 films
American science fiction action films
Films set on fictional planets
Films shot in Colorado
2010s English-language films
2010s American films